Described by Jean Baudrillard, the concept of hyperreality captures the inability to distinguish "The Real" (a term borrowed from Jacques Lacan) from the signifier of it. This is more prominent in technologically advanced societies. Hyperreality is seen as a condition in which what is real and what is fiction are seamlessly blended together so that there is no clear distinction between where one ends and the other begins. It allows the merging of physical reality with virtual reality (VR) or augmented reality (AR), and human intelligence with artificial intelligence (AI).

Jean Baudrillard was a French cultural theorist, sociologist and philosopher. His most notable work consists of establishing the concept of hyperreality and the simulacra. Some of Baudrillard's most influential theorists consist of Karl Marx, Freud, Levi Strauss, Nietzsche, etc. Baudrillard's work stems around his interest in the theories of post-structuralism and post-modernism. Some famous theorists who contributed to the field of hyperreality/hyperrealism include Jean Baudrillard, Albert Borgmann, Daniel J. Boorstin, Neil Postman and Umberto Eco.
The study of hyperreality and the effects it has on the consumer falls under the study of  semiotics and postmodernism studies.  As the study of semiotics advances, codes are used to categorize a map of meanings. These codes are systems of ideas that people use to interpret behaviours and messages they receive. Cultural codes are specific sets of knowledge that provides reference points in the process of interpretation of signs. Thus codes connect semiotics systems of meaning with social values and structure.

Postmodernism is a scholarly tradition in the field of communication studies that speaks directly to larger social concerns. Postmodernism was established through the social turmoil of the 1960s, spurred by social movements that questioned pre-existing conventions and social institutions. Through the postmodern lens reality is viewed as fragmented, locally produced and polysemic. Social realities are constantly produced and reproduced, ever changing through the use of language and symbolic forms. Systems, signs, objects and symbols are viewed to have multiple meanings.

Origins and usage 
The postmodern semiotic concept of "hyperreality" was contentiously coined by French sociologist Jean Baudrillard in Simulacra and Simulation Baudrillard defined "hyperreality" as "the generation by models of a real without origin or reality"; and his earlier book Symbolic Exchange and Death. hyperreality is a representation, a sign, without an original referent. According to Baudrillard, the commodities in this theoretical state do not have use-value as defined by Karl Marx but can be understood as signs as defined by Ferdinand de Saussure. He believes hyperreality goes further than confusing or blending the 'real' with the symbol which represents it; it involves creating a symbol or set of signifiers which represent something that does not actually exist, like Santa Claus. Baudrillard borrows, from Jorge Luis Borges' "On Exactitude in Science" (already borrowed from Lewis Carroll), the example of a society whose cartographers create a map so detailed that it covers the very things it was designed to represent. When the empire declines, the map fades into the landscape.  He says that, in such a case, neither the representation nor the real remains, just the hyperreal.

Baudrillard's idea of hyperreality was heavily influenced by phenomenology, semiotics, and Marshall McLuhan. Baudrillard and Eco explained that it is "the unlimited existence of "hyperreal" number or "non-standard reals", infinite and infinitesimal, that cluster about assumedly fixed or real numbers and factor through transference differentials." Baudrillard, however, challenges McLuhan's famous statement that "the medium is the message," by suggesting that information devours its own content. He also suggested that there is a difference between the media and reality and what they represent. Hyperreality is the inability of consciousness to distinguish reality from a simulation of reality, especially in technologically advanced societies. However, Baudrillard's hyperreality theory goes a step further than McLuhan's medium theory: "There is not only an implosion of the message in the medium, there is, in the same movement, the implosion of the medium itself in the real, the implosion of the medium and of the real in a sort of hyperreal nebula, in which even the definition and distinct action of the medium can no longer be determined".

American author Micah Dunham explores the notion of hyperreality further by suggesting that the action of hyperreality is to desire reality and in the attempt to achieve that desire, to fabricate a false reality that is to be consumed as real. Linked to contemporary western culture Umberto Eco and post-structuralists would argue, that in current cultures fundamental ideals are built on desire and particular sign-systems.

Temenuga Trifonova from University of California, San Diego notes,

Significance 
Hyperreality is significant as a paradigm to explain current cultural conditions. Consumerism, because of its reliance on sign exchange value (e.g. brand X shows that one is fashionable, car Y indicates one's wealth), could be seen as a contributing factor in the creation of hyperreality or the hyperreal condition. Hyperreality tricks consciousness into detaching from any real emotional engagement, instead opting for artificial simulation, and endless reproductions of fundamentally empty appearance. Essentially (although Baudrillard himself may balk at the use of this word), fulfillment or happiness is found through simulation and imitation of a transient simulacrum of reality, rather than any interaction with any "real" reality.

While hyperreality is not a new concept, its effects are more relevant in modern society, incorporating technological advancements like artificial intelligence, virtual reality and neurotechnology (simulated reality). This is attributed to the way it effectively captured the postmodern condition, particularly how people in the postmodern world seek stimulation by creating unreal worlds of spectacle and seduction and nothing more.  There are dangers to the use of hyperreality within our culture; individuals may observe and accept hyperreal images as role models when the images don't necessarily represent real physical people. This can result in a desire to strive for an unobtainable ideal, or it may lead to a lack of unimpaired role models. Daniel J. Boorstin cautions against confusing celebrity worship with hero worship, "we come dangerously close to depriving ourselves of all real models. We lose sight of the men and women who do not simply seem great because they are famous but who are famous because they are great". He bemoans the loss of old heroes like Moses, Odysseus, Aeneas, Jesus, Julius Caesar, Muhammed, Joan of Arc, William Shakespeare, George Washington, Napoleon, and Abraham Lincoln, who did not have public relations (PR) agencies to construct hyperreal images of themselves. The dangers of hyperreality are also facilitated by information technologies, which provide tools to dominant powers that seek to encourage it to drive consumption and materialism. The danger in the pursuit of stimulation and seduction emerge not in the lack of meaning but, as Baudrillard maintained, "we are gorged with meaning and it is killing us."

Hyperreality, some sources point out, may provide insights into the postmodern movement by analyzing how simulations disrupt the binary opposition between reality and illusion but  it does not address or resolve the contradictions inherent in this tension.

Key relational themes
The concepts most fundamental to hyperreality are those of simulation and the simulacrum, first conceptualized by Jean Baudrillard in his book Simulacra and Simulation.  The two terms are separate entities with relational origin connections to Baudrillard's theory of hyperreality.

Simulation
Simulation is characterized by a blending of 'reality' and representation, where there is no clear indication of where the former stops and the latter begins. Simulation is no longer that of a territory, a referential being, or a substance; "It is the generation by models of a real without origin or reality: a hyperreal." Baudrillard suggests that simulation no longer takes place in a physical realm; it takes place within a space not categorized by physical limits i.e., within ourselves, technological simulations, etc.

Simulacrum
The simulacrum is often defined as a copy with no original, or as Gilles Deleuze (1990) describes it, "the simulacrum is an image without resemblance". Baudrillard argues that a simulacrum is not a copy of the real, but becomes truth in its own right. He created four steps of reproduction: (1) basic reflection of reality, (2) perversion of reality; (3) pretense of reality (where there is no model); and (4) simulacrum, which "bears no relation to any reality whatsoever".

Hyperstition
The concept of "hyperstition" as expounded upon by the Cybernetic Culture Research Unit generalizes the notion of hyperreality to encompass the concept of "fictional entities that make themselves real." In Nick Land's own words:
The concept of hyperstition is also related to the concept of "theory-fiction." An oft-cited example of such a process is that of cyberspace, which originated in William Gibson's 1984 novel Neuromancer. By the mid-1990s, the realization of this concept had begun to emerge on a mass scale in the form of the internet

Consequence 
The truth was already being called into question with the rise of media and technology, but with the presence of hyperreality being used most and embraced as a new technology, there are a couple of issues or consequences of hyperreality. It's difficult enough to hear something on the news and choose not to believe it, but it's quite another to see an image of an event or anything and use your empirical sense to determine whether the news is true or false, which is one of the consequences of hyperrealism. The first is the possibility of various simulations being used to influence the audience, resulting in an inability to differentiate fiction from reality, which affects the overall truth value of a subject at hand. Another implication or disadvantage is the possibility of being manipulated by what we see. The audience can interpret different messages depending on the ideology of the entity behind an image. As a result, power equates to control over the media and the people. Celebrities, for example, have their photographs taken and altered so that the public can see the final result. The public then perceives celebrities based on what they have seen rather than how they truly are. It can progress to the point where celebrities appear completely different. As a result of celebrities' body modifications and editing, there has been an increase in surgeries and a decrease in self-esteem during adolescence. Because the truth is threatened, a similar outcome for hyperreality is possible.

Future 
Some believe that the future of hyperreality can be seen through a shift in how people use the internet. The transition from Web 1.0 to Web 2.0 to Web3 can be used to illustrate where hyperreality can lead us. Web 1.0 was designed for reading, with readers being able to search for a topic and read it online. Yahoo, Google, and MSN are examples of Web 1.0. Instagram, TikTok, and Messenger are examples of Web 2.0 platforms that transform what was once a reading platform into an interaction platform. Web3 is a newer platform that allows users to fully integrate the virtual world into a decentralised environment. Filecoin and the metaverse are two examples of Web3 where users can participate in a virtual world.

Because it can be used to simulate reality and add depth to the experience, hyperreality is useful in training, education, military, and medical settings. With the rise of hyperreality and technological progress, the next logical step would be to combine the two. One of the future challenges of hyperreality is the lack of laws governing its use and development. Decentralisation of a virtual world can result in an uncontrolled or slightly biased environment, which is a potential drawback. Baudrillard wrote a book called “The Gulf War Did Not Take Place” in which he discusses media bias and how media is used to portray a "reality" in order to set an agenda. As a result, because there is no distinction between what is real and the simulation chosen to be believed or portrayed, people will believe what they see.

Role in media 
As society has transitioned toward a consumer culture, it is apparent that the combination of the free market economy and the advancements found within media and communication technologies have influenced this development. Through the emergence of new media technologies and the ever-growing role of media found within the modern day, a growing link is displayed between the incorporation and effects of hyperreality. There is a strong link between media and the impact that the presence of hyperreality has on its viewers. This has shown to blur the lines between artificial realities and reality, influencing the day to day experiences of those exposed to it. As hyperreality captures the inability to distinguish reality from a simulation of reality, common media outlets such as news, social media platforms, radio and television contribute to this misconception of true reality.

Through Jean Baudrillard's book Simulacra and Simulation, Baudrillard describes hyper reality as a critical theory of postmodernism. The negative impacts of hyperreality are found in media and literature. They present themselves as becoming blended with reality, which influence the experience of life and truth for its viewers. Baudrillard explains these impacts as having a direct effect on younger generations who idolize the heroes, characters or influencers found on these platforms. As media is a social institution that shapes and develops its members within society, the exposure to hyperreality found within these platforms present an everlasting effect. Baudrillard concludes that exposure to hyperreality over time will lead to confusion and chaos, leading toward the destruction of identity, originality and character.

Social media and public image 
With the introduction of the smartphone in the early 2000s, online presence and presence in the real world have become synonymous. An individual's digital footprint can often tell us more about an individual than their real lives. This is because people's behaviors can change dramatically on the internet with virtually no repercussions or laws telling them to do so; the internet has become the anarchist's safe haven. The role social media has in society has dramatically increased in the recent decades and creating a public image or online presence has become an online standard. Twitter has become a main source for public figures to express themselves and for corporations to inform the public. The hyperreality environment on the internet has shifted dramatically over the course of the COVID-19 pandemic, so much so that it has an influence on the Italian Stock Exchange in 2021. The hyperreality created on social media platforms is so strong and influential, its quality and emotion are translated in the physical reality where value has been lost and careers are damaged. Emotions expressed on social media are directly having real-life effects on numerous sectors despite having any factual basis or tangible information. As social media becomes more ingrained into the daily lives of countless individuals, the distinction between stories on the internet and truth in real life are becoming more blurred as it descends into the core of hyperreality.

The proliferation of social media has led the way for instantaneous sharing of not only information, but emotions, opinions and culture. The Netflix special, Squid Game, a Korean drama TV series, saw unprecedented numbers in terms of viewership and audience feedback. The show became a cultural phenomena, starting in South Korea and branching worldwide, gathering billions of views and reaching audiences across the world. The show featured numerous childhood activities native to South Korea that many Korean adults knew and were familiar with but were completely foreign to any other nation. The show created hyperreal conditions on the internet where millions were sharing their own feelings and opinions about the show, even going as far as to play the games and practice the activities portrayed in the show. The hyperreal conditions were created so effectively that individuals were picking up unique Korean cultural aspects but only giving credit to the show and not the country; individuals believed the show created these games. This is hugely significant because it illustrates Baudrillard's notion of models or reality without reality; a fictional TV show produced real events and practices and completely removed the real cultural significance. Countless TV shows have done this in the past but none to the extent of Squid Game or in such reach; where individuals who did not know the language, country or culture were practicing Korean games almost unknowingly. The Hollywood sign in Los Angeles, California, itself produces similar notions, but is more a symbol of hyperreality, the creation of a city with its main target being media production.

The increase in social media influencers has shown rise to a popular 'story telling' trend, where creators recount past experiences, often exaggerating and dramatizing the experience for perceived importance and relevance. The trend mixes reality with the virtual world as viewers often feel part of the creators' life and identify with this given image the creator produces for their audience. Social media currently offers what news and other sources of media could not forty years ago, the chance to not only share news but to also create news. To exaggerate this even further, TikTok has seen the nuance of AI accounts that present themselves as human-like animated beings with unique personalities, artificial social circles and personal likes and interests. Once designed by humans, now completely independent of any influence, these AI creations have mass followings that present conditions of perfect four-dimensional simulation as described by Baudrillard. With the incentive for viewership and notoriety, social media influencers/creators have little incentive to produce meaningful and actual news and instead lean toward these storytelling methods that produce large reactions that blur the lines or reality and false online narratives.

Examples

Disneyland 
Both Umberto Eco and Jean Baudrillard refer to Disneyland as an example of hyperreality. Eco believes that Disneyland with its settings such as Main Street and full sized houses has been created to look "absolutely realistic", taking visitors' imagination to a "fantastic past". This false reality creates an illusion and makes it more desirable for people to buy this reality. Disneyland works in a system that enables visitors to feel that technology and the created atmosphere "can give us more reality than nature can". The "fake nature" of Disneyland satisfies our imagination and daydream fantasies in real life. The idea is that nothing in this world is real. Nothing is original, but all are endless copies of reality. Since we do not imagine the reality of simulations, both imagined and real are equally hyperreal, for example, the numerous simulated rides, including the submarine ride and the Mississippi boat tour. When entering Disneyland, consumers form into lines to gain access to each attraction. Then they are ordered by people with special uniforms to follow the rules, such as where to stand or where to sit. If the consumers follow each rule correctly, they can enjoy "the real thing" and see things that are not available to them outside of Disneyland's doors.

In his work Simulacra and Simulation, Baudrillard argues the "imaginary world" of Disneyland magnetizes people inside and has been presented as "imaginary" to make people believe that all its surroundings are "real". But he believes that the Los Angeles area is not real; thus it is hyperreal. Disneyland is a set of apparatuses which tries to bring imagination and fiction to what is called "real". This concerns the American values and way of life in a sense and "concealing the fact that the real is no longer real, and thus of saving the reality principle."
"The Disneyland imaginary is neither true or false: it is a deterrence machine set up in order to rejuvenate in reverse the fiction of the real. Whence the debility, the infantile degeneration of this imaginary. It's meant to be an infantile world, in order to make us believe that the adults are elsewhere, in the "real" world, and to conceal the fact that real childishness is everywhere, particularly among those adults who go there to act the child in order to foster illusions of their real childishness."

Filmography 
The 1999 film Existenz follows Allegra Geller, a game designer who finds herself targeted by assassins while playing a virtual reality game of her own creation.
 The 2008 film Synecdoche, New York in which the life of the main character Caden Cotard is lived in the confines of a warehouse made to be the set of a play which is about his life, blurring all distinction between what is real and the simulation.
 The 2014 film Birdman portrays a theater director haunted by making his show as authentic as possible, leading to people getting hurt.

Other examples 

 Films in which characters and settings are either digitally enhanced or created entirely from CGI (e.g., 300, where the entire film was shot in front of a blue/green screen, with all settings super-imposed).
 In A Clockwork Orange, when Alex says, "It's funny how the colors of the real world only seem really real when you viddy them on the screen" when he undergoes Ludovico's Technique.
 A well-manicured garden (nature as hyperreal).
 Any massively promoted versions of historical or present "facts" (e.g., "General Ignorance" from QI, where the questions have seemingly obvious answers, which are actually wrong).
 Professional sports athletes as super, invincible versions of human beings.
 Many world cities and places which did not evolve as functional places with some basis in reality, as if they were creatio ex nihilo (literally 'creation out of nothing'): Black Rock City; Disney World; Dubai; Celebration, Florida; Cancun and Las Vegas.
 TV and film in general (especially "reality" TV), due to its creation of a world of fantasy and its dependence that the viewer will engage with these fantasy worlds. The current trend is to glamorize the mundane using histrionics.
 A retail store that looks completely stocked and perfect due to facing, creating an illusion of more merchandise than there actually is.
 A high end sex doll used as a simulacrum of an unattainable partner.
 A newly made building or item designed to look old, or to recreate or reproduce an older artifact, by simulating the feel of age or aging. Such as Reborn Dolls. 
 Constructed languages (such as E-Prime) or "reconstructed" extinct dialects.
 Second Life: The distinction becomes blurred when it becomes the platform for RL (real life) courses and conferences such as Alcoholics Anonymous meetings or leads to real world interactions behind the scenes.
 Weak virtual reality.
 The superfictional airline company Ingold Airlines.
 Works within the spectrum of the Vaporwave musical genre often encompass themes of hyperreality through parody of the information revolution.
Plastic surgery: the constructed face that effaces the distinction between "natural" and "artificial" in the syntax of beauty.
 Airbrushed images of men and women. For example, Dove's Campaign for Real Beauty.
The superfictional video game Petscop.
ChatGPT is highly proficient at confidently generating answers which are wrong. For example, it has argued with all seriousness that the word cat starts with the letter S, but can employ many different formats, from essays to casual conversation. See Hallucination (artificial intelligence).

See also 
 Allegory of the cave
 Authenticity (philosophy)
 Consensus reality
 Cyberspace
Life imitating art
 Marx's theory of alienation
Post-irony
 Post-truth politics
Sandbox game
 Simulated reality
 Solipsism
 Theme park

References

Bibliography
Jean Baudrillard, "The Precession of Simulacra", in Media and Cultural Studies : Keyworks, Durham & Kellner, eds. 
D.M. Boje (1995), "Stories of the storytelling organization: a postmodern analysis of Disney as 'Tamara-land'", Academy of Management Journal, 38(4), pp. 997–1035.
Daniel Boorstin, The Image: A Guide to Pseudo-Events in America (1992). 
Albert Borgmann, Crossing the Postmodern Divide (1992).
George Ritzer, The McDonaldization of Society (2004). 
 Charles Arthur Willard Liberalism and the Problem of Knowledge: A New Rhetoric for Modern Democracy. University of Chicago Press. 1996.
 Andreas Martin Lisewski (2006), "The concept of strong and weak virtual reality", Minds and Machines, 16(2), pp. 201–21
 Lazaroiu, George. "Cybernews and hyperreality." Economics, Management and Financial Markets 3, no. 2 (2008): 69.
 Pasco, M. O. D. (2008). Contemporary Media Society in the Age of Hyperreality. Prajñā Vihāra: Journal of Philosophy and Religion, 9(1).
 Laughey, Dan.Key Themes in Media Theory. Open University Press,2007.pp. 148–149

External links 
International Journal of Baudrillard Studies
Baudrillard and Hyperreality; Simulacro y régimen de mortandad en el Sistema de los objetos (Disney World and Hyperreality)  by Adolfo Vasquez Rocca
Reality/Hyperreality, The Chicago School of Media Theory

 
Consensus reality
Philosophy of technology
Postmodern theory
Reality by type